José Vitor Rodrigues Ribeiro da Silva (born 23 September 1991), known as Zé Vitor, is a Brazilian footballer who currently plays for União Frederiquense as a defensive midfielder.

Career

ŠK Slovan Bratislava
In August 2011, he joined Slovak club Slovan Bratislava on loan from São Paulo.

Career statistics

As of 13 August 2011

Honours

Club

Youth
 São Paulo
Copa São Paulo de Futebol Júnior: 2010

References

External links
Profile at São Paulo's website

External links
Zé Vitor at ZeroZero

1991 births
Living people
Brazilian footballers
Brazilian expatriate footballers
Association football midfielders
Campeonato Brasileiro Série A players
São Paulo FC players
ŠK Slovan Bratislava players
Associação Desportiva São Caetano players
Associação Chapecoense de Futebol players
Rio Claro Futebol Clube players
São Carlos Futebol Clube players
Sport Club Atibaia players
Associação Olímpica de Itabaiana players
Slovak Super Liga players
Expatriate footballers in Slovakia
Brazilian expatriate sportspeople in Slovakia
Karmiotissa FC players
Cypriot Second Division players
Expatriate footballers in Cyprus
Brazilian expatriate sportspeople in Cyprus
Footballers from São Paulo